The Hôtel Hannon is an Art Nouveau town house in the municipality of Saint-Gilles in Brussels, Belgium. The house was constructed in 1903 and 1904 for the industrialist Édouard Hannon, and is the only Art Nouveau house designed by the Belgian architect Jules Brunfaut.

Location
The Hôtel Hannon is located at 1, /, at the corner of the /, in Saint-Gilles, "in a neighbourhood which, even today, remains a sacred district of architectural jewels."

History
Édouard Hannon was an engineer with the Solvay company and the long-time manager of Solvay's sodium carbonate plant at Dombasle-sur-Meurthe, just south of Nancy, France, as well as a painter, art critic and photographer. He gave the task of conceiving and building his new house to his friend Jules Brunfaut, asking him to use the Art Nouveau style that Hannon loved very much and that was popular both in Brussels and Nancy. The house was occupied by the Hannon family until 1965. Upon the death of the original owner's daughter, the property was abandoned, vandalised, and eventually threatened with demolition. In 1973, the daughter of Jules Brunfaut consulted the Royal Commission of Monuments and Sites and made enquiries as to the status of this work of her father, which was still unoccupied; as a result of her efforts, the exterior of the building was classified as a historic monument in 1976. The building was acquired by the municipality of Saint-Gilles in 1979, the interior was classified in 1983, and the building underwent a significant renovation between 1984 and 1989.

In 1988, the Hôtel Hannon was put at the disposal of the Espace photographique Contretype, which, in addition to conserving the photographic work of Édouard Hannon, works to promote creative photography through expositions, retrospectives of artists, conferences and their publications. After having occupied the Hôtel until 2014, Contretype moved to the Cité Fontainas, another building in Saint-Gilles.

In 2022, the entirely renovated building will become a museum, under the auspices of the team at the Horta Museum. Visitors will be able to rediscover the furniture of Émile Gallé, which will return to its original home.

Architecture
The facades of the Hôtel Hannon combine white brick, limestone, and granite. The house has two very asymmetrical facades: a short one of a single bay on the Avenue Brugmann, and a more important facade of two bays on the Avenue de la Jonction, with the two facades joined by a three-bay angular span between them. The facade of the Avenue de la Jonction presents a play of volumes in projections and recesses. Its central bay carries a large bay window comprising a limestone base, a chassis in wood that holds a stained glass window by Raphaël Évaldre and a roof covered in zinc, surmounted by a setback of the upper floors, pierced by a triplet of windows on the first floor and a pair of windows on the second floor.

The corner, consisting of three bays, is ornamented with a remarkable balcony of wrought iron undergirded by a stone substructure that extends from the base to the first floor, where they "open into volutes." The upper level of the corner bay is decorated with a large bas-relief by Victor Rousseau entitled La fileuse ("The spinner"), which is an allegory of Time.

The building is a rather clumsy Art Nouveau design, and Brunfaut's discomfort with the style is evident, but the architect nonetheless took some cues from his fellow, more adept Art Nouveau designer Victor Horta, such as the impressive central staircase, a typical design element in Horta's residences such as the Hôtel Tassel, the Hôtel Solvay, and the Hôtel van Eetvelde.

Interior
The architect called on numerous artists for the interior and exterior decoration of the building. The conception of the furniture (which will return to the house in 2022 with the opening of the museum) and the interior decoration is the work of Émile Gallé and Louis Majorelle. Certain frescoes in the smoking room and the stair hall are the work of the painter Paul Albert Baudouin. The staircase ironwork is by Pierre Desmedt, and the stained glass the work of Raphaël Évaldre.

See also
 Art Nouveau in Brussels
 Art Nouveau in Belgium (in French)
 List of Historic Monuments in Saint-Gilles (in French)

External links

 https://www.maisonhannon.be/en
 https://visit.brussels/en/place/Hotel-Hannon
 https://www.youtube.com/watch?v=8H5dWBo_RJE
 https://aboutartnouveau.wordpress.com/2013/12/27/hotel-hannon-brussels/
 http://www.contretype.org/v1/angl/01/01_02.html

References

Houses in Belgium
Museums in Brussels
Historic house museums in Belgium
Saint-Gilles, Belgium
Art Nouveau architecture in Brussels
Art Nouveau houses
Photography museums and galleries in Belgium
Buildings and structures completed in 1904